Dypsis crinita is a species of flowering plant in the family Arecaceae. It is found only in Madagascar. It is threatened by habitat loss.

References

crinita
Endemic flora of Madagascar
Near threatened plants
Taxonomy articles created by Polbot
Taxa named by Henri Lucien Jumelle
Taxa named by Joseph Marie Henry Alfred Perrier de la Bâthie